"El Regreso" (English: "The Return") is the third track from WarCry's ¿Dónde Está La Luz?.  "El Regreso" is a well-known song among the band's fans and one of their most controversial ones due to the lyrics referring to revenge from a son to his alcoholic father who abused of him and his mother.  "El Regreso" is featured on live album Directo A La Luz on both DVD and CD versions.

Meaning
Víctor García explained the song meaning on the album's "Song by Song" in their website:
One of the album's most controversial songs. The news about abuse both physical and psychological are on the agenda for television, radio, press, in fact... all media. There are thousands of ways of mistreatment and have existed since long before being given publicity. There are cultural abuse (in many countries women are almost considered an animal), religious (the ability to be a representative of God is only masculine). But there's a big difference when one see something like this: Husband kills wife after years of abuse with the presence of major children.

We always talk about trying to avoid the tragedy but... imagine you grow up in that environment, which will certainly create a rejection frm yo toward your father, since it's quite possible that in addition to the abuse with your mother has been also on you. This is not correct (Politically)  but in this case, wouldn't you fight with everything, legal ways, relatives and even force to stop the aggressor? Thanks God I haven't experienced such situation before, but I accept that just by thinking about it, makes my blood boil.

We have technologically advanced, but still dragging the old stigmas of the human being as ignorance, incompetence, indifference... and many more, but these three are enough to ask me the famous phrase cogito ergo sum (I think, therefore I am) . Today is almost proved that many of the existing people are losing the ability to think and act to solve this and other very similar problems.As already said... Errare humanum est.

Personnel

Band
 Víctor García - vocals
 Pablo García - guitars
 Fernando Mon - guitars
 Roberto García - bass
 Manuel Ramil - keyboards
 Alberto Ardines - drums

Production
 Esteban Casosolas - Sounds
 Simón "Big Simon" Echeverría - Mastering

External links
WarCry's Official website
Official MySpace
El Regreso at YouTube

Notes

WarCry (band) songs
2005 songs